The Corona Three Nations Cup (also referred to as the North American Nations Cup or North American Championship) was an association football championship for CONCACAF's North American Zone.

Overview
The North American Football Confederation (NAFC) held a similar competition in 1947 and 1949. While Canada was a founding member of the NAFC, it did not participate in the first two championships. In 1990, the North American Zone re-introduced its championship, hosted by Canada. Although Mexico and Canada sent their full national teams, the U.S. sent its B-team and does not count these games as part of its official internationals.

Venues

Results

Scorers
Three goals
 John Catliff
Two goals
 Luis Flores

References

External links
 Tournament results

1990
1990
1990 in CONCACAF football
1990 in Canadian soccer
1990 in American soccer
1989–90 in Mexican football